Across the Universe is a 2007 jukebox musical romantic drama film directed by Julie Taymor, centered on songs by the Beatles. The script is based on an original story credited to Taymor, Dick Clement, and Ian La Frenais, and based on the song of the same name by Lennon–McCartney. It incorporates 34 compositions originally written by members of the Beatles. The film stars Evan Rachel Wood, Jim Sturgess, Joe Anderson and T.V. Carpio, and introduces Dana Fuchs and Martin Luther McCoy as actors. Cameo appearances are made by Bono, Eddie Izzard, Joe Cocker, and Salma Hayek, among others.

Across the Universe premiered at the Toronto International Film Festival on September 14, 2007, and was theatrically released in the United States on October 12 by Columbia Pictures. The film received mixed reviews from critics, with many praising the visuals, cast and singing performances, though criticized the plot and direction. The film was a major box-office bomb, failing to earn even half of its total production budget at the box office. The film received a Golden Globe nomination for Best Motion Picture – Musical or Comedy and an Oscar nomination for Best Costume Design. Two members of the supporting cast, Carol Woods and Timothy T. Mitchum, performed as part of a special Beatles tribute at the 50th Grammy Awards.

Plot
Set in the 1960s. Jude Feeney, a shipyard worker in Liverpool, heads to the US to find his G.I. father who conceived him during World War II, whom he has never met. He promises his girlfriend Molly he will stay in touch while he is away.

Meanwhile, in New Jersey, Lucy Carrigan worries about her boyfriend Daniel, who is headed for service in the Vietnam War. In Dayton, Ohio, cheerleader Prudence pines for a fellow female cheerleader, and then drops out of school in shame.

Jude meets his father Wes, a janitor at Princeton University, but does not particularly bond with him. While on campus, he meets and befriends slacker student Max, who brings him home for Thanksgiving He introduces Jude to his family, including Lucy, his younger sister.

Max drops out of college; he and Jude move into a bohemian enclave in Greenwich Village run by a singer, Sadie. Jude becomes a freelance artist and Max a cab driver. Daniel is killed in Vietnam and Lucy attends his funeral. In Detroit, a young African-American boy is killed in the 1967 riot. His adult brother Jo-Jo, a guitarist, moves to New York for a change of scenery and auditions for Sadie's band. They are soon joined by Prudence who had hitchhiked there.

Lucy visits Max in New York before starting college, and she and Jude fall in love. Max,  initially displeased upon learning they slept together, finally gives them his blessing. Later, Max is drafted into the army and sent to Vietnam, as he is no longer a college student protected from the draft. Prudence is attracted to Sadie and becomes depressed when Sadie and Jo-Jo begin a relationship.

Lucy becomes increasingly involved in the anti-war movement. Jude remains comparatively apolitical but devoted to her. Sadie is offered a chance to go on a solo tour as a headliner, leading to a bitter breakup between her and Jo-Jo. Jude dislikes the increasing amount of time Lucy spends with the Students for a Democratic Republic, led by activist Paco, as he suspects that Paco is attempting to seduce her.

Jude storms into the SDR office leading to an argument with Lucy and a fight with Paco after which Jude is thrown out and she breaks up with him. Some time later, Jude follows her to an anti-war demonstration at Columbia University. When the police arrest Lucy, Paco, and the other activists, Jude's attempts to reach her lead to his arrest as well.

With Jude facing deportation, Lucy contacts his father. Wes visits him in jail but has no legal proof that he is his son and thus an American citizen. As a result, Jude is sent back to England. Returning to his job at the Liverpool shipyards, he runs into his former girlfriend Molly and sees that she is heavily pregnant by her current partner. She met him around the time Jude stopped writing her (when he started seeing Lucy).

Jo-Jo continues playing solo guitar in bars, while the highly successful Sadie drowns her sorrow and loneliness in alcohol on tour. Max is wounded in Vietnam and sent home. Lucy visits him in the hospital but he is traumatized and dependent on morphine. Meanwhile, she continues her activities with the SDR and is involved with Paco, but is uncomfortable with him leading the movement deeper into violence.

Lucy leaves Paco and the organization when she finds him making bombs, and she is surrounded by constant reminders of Jude. One of Paco's homemade bombs explodes, killing him and his confederates. Upon reading this news, Jude fears Lucy is also dead. He learns from Max over the phone that she had left the group beforehand and is alive, and he arranges to return to NYC legally.

Jo-Jo and Sadie, who have reconciled, put on a rooftop concert. Max brings Jude to the rooftop. When the police arrive to break up the concert, Jude manages to remain on the roof and begins to sing. The police allow the band to rejoin him. He notices Lucy on the opposite rooftop, standing and looking at him. Lucy and Jude gaze smilingly at each other as the performance concludes.

Cast

The names of the six main characters (and most minor characters) were inspired by Beatles song titles and lyrics.

 Evan Rachel Wood as Lucy ("Lucy in the Sky with Diamonds")
 Jim Sturgess as Jude ("Hey Jude")
 Joe Anderson as Max ("Maxwell's Silver Hammer")
 Dana Fuchs as Sadie ("Sexy Sadie")
 Martin Luther McCoy as Jo-Jo ("Get Back")
 T.V. Carpio as Prudence ("Dear Prudence")
 Spencer Liff as Daniel, Lucy's high school boyfriend ("Rocky Raccoon")
 Lisa Hogg as Molly, Jude's Liverpool girlfriend ("Ob-La-Di, Ob-La-Da")
 Angela Mounsey as Martha Feeny, Jude's mother ("Martha My Dear")
 Robert Clohessy as Wesley "Wes" Hubert, Jude's father 
 Dylan Baker and Linda Emond as Lucy's parents (the Carrigans, Jerry Carrigan opened The Beatles' first performance in America)
 Lynn Cohen as Grandmother Carrigan
 Bill Irwin as Uncle Teddy ("Teddy Boy")
 Timothy T. Mitchum as Jo-Jo's younger brother
 Carol Woods as Gospel singer at the brother's funeral ("Let It Be")
 Joe Cocker as Bum / Pimp / Mad Hippie
 Jacob Pitts as Rat magazine employee
 Staceyann Chin as Rat magazine employee
 Harry Lennix as army sergeant
 Logan Marshall-Green as Paco
 James Urbaniak as Bill, Sadie's manager ("The Continuing Story of Bungalow Bill")
 Bono as Dr. Robert ("Doctor Robert")
 Daniel Ezralow as Mother Superior ("Happiness Is a Warm Gun")
 Eddie Izzard as Mr. Kite ("Being for the Benefit of Mr. Kite!")
 Arabella Holzbog as Prankster
 Ekaterina Sknarina as Rita, Prudence's girlfriend, a contortionist for Mr. Kite's circus. ("Lovely Rita")
 Salma Hayek as Bang Bang Shoot Shoot Nurses ("Happiness Is a Warm Gun")

Music

Musical numbers
List of 33 Beatles compositions on the soundtrack in order, including three compositions heard twice, totalling 34 individual music cues:

 "Girl" — Jude
 "Helter Skelter" — Sadie
 "Hold Me Tight" — Lucy, Molly, and Prom Night singers
 "All My Loving" — Jude
 "I Want to Hold Your Hand" — Prudence
 "With a Little Help from My Friends" — Max, Jude, and Dorm buddies
 "It Won't Be Long" — Lucy and Students
 "I've Just Seen a Face" — Jude
 "Let It Be" — Gospel singer, Jojo's brother, and Church choir
 "Come Together" — Pimp, Bum, Mad Hippie, Jojo, and Prostitutes
 "Why Don't We Do It in the Road?" — Sadie
 "If I Fell" — Lucy
 "I Want You (She's So Heavy)" — Max, Sadie, Prudence, Uncle Sam, and Soldiers
 "Dear Prudence" — Sadie, Jude, Lucy, and Max
 "Flying"  (instrumental) — The Secret Machines
 "Blue Jay Way" — The Secret Machines
 "I Am the Walrus" — Dr. Robert
 "Being for the Benefit of Mr. Kite!" — Mr. Kite
 "Because" — Lucy, Jude, Max, Sadie, Prudence, and Jojo
 "Something" — Jude
 "Oh! Darling" — Sadie and Jojo
 "Strawberry Fields Forever" — Jude and Max
 "Revolution" — Jude
 "While My Guitar Gently Weeps" — Jojo and Jude
 "Across the Universe" — Jude (interwoven with "Helter Skelter")
 "Helter Skelter (Reprise)" — Sadie (interwoven with "Across the Universe")
 "And I Love Her" (brief extract incorporated into the orchestral score during the "Across the Universe"/"Helter Skelter (Reprise)" sequence, also sung by McCoy in a deleted scene)
 "Happiness Is a Warm Gun" — Max, Bang Bang Shoot Shoot nurses, and Soldiers
 "A Day in the Life (Instrumental)" — Jeff Beck
 "Blackbird" — Lucy
 "Hey Jude" — Max, Jude's mother, Children and Immigrants
 "Don't Let Me Down" — Sadie and Jojo
 "All You Need Is Love" — Jude, Sadie, Prudence, Max, and Jojo
 "Lucy in the Sky with Diamonds" — Bono and The Edge (end credits)

Extended musical numbers
There is extra music, such as in "Hold Me Tight", to have more opportunity for things such as dance sequences. In "Come Together" on the special features, there is extra music for a dance solo and a well-planned "Six Degrees of Separation" which connects the main characters as they enter New York lifestyle. "I Want You (She's So Heavy)" is also extended to add time for Max's medical check-up that is shown and for the dialogue about Max eating cotton balls and other theories to get out of the draft. The extended music is used as underscoring for dialogue after "Dear Prudence", "Something", and "While My Guitar Gently Weeps". Some songs are not extended, but also have dialogue, such as "Revolution" and "All My Loving." Other extended songs include "I Am the Walrus", "Oh! Darling", "Across the Universe", and "Helter Skelter".

Soundtrack 

The film's end credits identify 33 Beatles compositions featured in the film, either in their entirety or in part. All of these songs were written from 1962 to 1969 by the members of the Beatles (John Lennon, Paul McCartney, George Harrison, and Ringo Starr) and recorded by the Beatles. Twenty-nine of them are compositions that are officially credited to the songwriting partnership of Lennon–McCartney. Three are credited to George Harrison. One title ("Flying") is a 1967 instrumental composition credited to all four members of the Beatles (Lennon–McCartney–Harrison–Starr).

Thirty of the soundtrack's songs feature vocals. Two of them ("And I Love Her" and "A Day in the Life") are brief instrumental versions of songs that were originally written with lyrics, although "And I Love Her" is sung in a deleted scene. One song ("Flying") was originally written as an instrumental.

Twenty-five of the vocal tracks are performed by one or more of the six lead cast members. Four of the songs are sung by stars with cameo roles (Bono, Eddie Izzard, Salma Hayek and Joe Cocker). One song ("Let It Be") is sung by supporting members of the cast. Another song ("Blue Jay Way") is sung by indie Texan trio the Secret Machines. In 29 of the vocal tracks, the vocalists are singing on-screen. Two of the vocal tracks ("Blue Jay Way" and "Lucy in the Sky with Diamonds") are sung by off-screen vocalists.

The remaining three of the 33 tracks are instrumentals. "Flying" is performed by the Secret Machines, "And I Love Her" is heard briefly as part of the orchestral score, and "A Day in the Life" is performed on guitar by Jeff Beck in a version recorded for Sir George Martin's 1998 album In My Life.

In addition to the Beatles compositions, the soundtrack features an original score composed by Elliot Goldenthal. Goldenthal worked on Taymor's previous films Titus and Frida. (Goldenthal and director Taymor have been romantic partners since 1982.)

Interscope Records has released three variations of the soundtrack from the film—a standard edition and two deluxe editions. The standard edition contains 16 tracks from the film soundtrack, although "Let It Be" is shortened, missing the third verse. The first version of the deluxe edition features 31 tracks—all of the vocal performances and one of the three instrumental tracks. In the US, this 31-track version is available solely at Best Buy stores and in a digital version from iTunes, while in Europe it is available at other retail outlets. A second version of the deluxe edition is available at other retail outlets and digital download suppliers. The second version differs from the 31-track version in that it omits two tracks ("Why Don't We Do It in the Road?" and "I Want You (She's So Heavy)").

The song "It Won't Be Long" was released as a single on iTunes on September 11, 2007. From October 15 to 17, 2007, and again from October 22 to 23, 2007, the 31-track deluxe edition was the #1 downloaded album on iTunes.

The soundtrack includes seven songs from The Beatles (also known as The White Album), five from Magical Mystery Tour, five from Abbey Road, four from Sgt. Pepper's Lonely Hearts Club Band, three from With the Beatles, two from A Hard Day's Night, two from Let It Be, one from Help!, one from Rubber Soul, and three other non-album singles.

Production
In March 2007, the media reported a dispute over the final cut of the film. Concerned with the length of director Julie Taymor's cut of the film, Revolution Studios chairman Joe Roth tested a sneak preview of a shortened version without first informing Taymor. The incident sparked some heat between the two, later involving Sony Pictures' Amy Pascal urging Taymor to agree to the shorter version. After several months of dispute, Taymor's version was eventually reinstated as the theatrically released version. While the production budget was originally reported as $45 million, documents from Roth's sale of Revolution Studios revealed the actual cost of the film to be $70.8 million.

Release and reception
The film's release date and release pattern became the subject of some media and public discussion. The film had been originally scheduled for release in 2006. The release was postponed as the editing process became extended and internal disputes arose. The film was subsequently scheduled for a wide release on approximately 1000 US screens on September 28, 2007. In early September 2007, Sony announced that the release would be brought forward to September 14, 2007, with a "platform release" pattern starting on a small number of screens—with additional screens to be added in subsequent weeks.

The film received its world premiere on Monday, September 10, 2007, at the Toronto International Film Festival. The film was then given a very limited "platform release" on 27 screens in the US on Friday, September 14. The film had the second-highest "per-screen" average on its opening weekend. In the following three weeks, the release was gradually expanded to select regions. After four weeks in limited release, on October 12, the film was elevated to a comparatively broader release on 954 US screens, breaking into the US box office top ten at #8.

Ringo Starr, Yoko Ono, Paul McCartney and Olivia Harrison praised the film after seeing it. Julie Taymor, the director of the film was interviewed about her screening with McCartney: "At the end of the screening I did the classic thing. I asked him, 'Was there anything you didn't like?' He said, 'What's not to like?'"

The DVD, UMD, and Blu-ray formats were released on February 5, 2008. On  January 9, 2018, the film was re-released as an Ultra HD Blu-ray.

Critical reception
Rotten Tomatoes gives the film an approval rating of 53% based on 179 reviews, with an average rating of 5.9/10. The website's critical consensus reads, "Psychedelic musical numbers can't mask Across the Universes clichéd love story and thinly written characters." Metacritic gives the film a weighted average score of 56 out of 100, based on 29 critics, indicating "mixed or average reviews".

Roger Ebert of the Chicago Sun-Times was extremely positive towards the film, giving it four out of four stars, calling it "an audacious marriage of cutting-edge visual techniques, heart-warming performances, 1960s history and the Beatles songbook" and calling Julie Taymor an "inventive choreographer".

The film appeared on a few notable critics' top ten lists of the best films of 2007, including 34 from American film critics:

 1st – Carrie Rickey, The Philadelphia Inquirer
 7th – Roger Ebert, Chicago Sun-Times
 9th – Stephen Holden, The New York Times

Awards
 65th Golden Globe Awards
 Nominee for Golden Globe Award for Best Motion Picture - Musical or Comedy
 80th Academy Awards
 Nominee for Best Costume Design
 19th GLAAD Media Awards
 Nominee for Best Film – Wide Release

Sequel
In October 2020, Julie Taymor announced that developments were underway for a sequel. Jim Sturgess and Evan Rachel Wood have had discussions with the filmmaker to reprise their roles, while the story would take place during the 1970s and feature additional songs by the Beatles.

See also
 List of cover versions of Beatles songs
 The Beatles' influence on popular culture

References

External links

 
 
 
 
 

The Beatles tribute albums
2007 films
2000s musical films
2007 romantic drama films
American musical drama films
American romantic drama films
American romantic musical films
Anti-war films about the Vietnam War
British musical films
British romantic drama films
Columbia Pictures films
Revolution Studios films
The Beatles in film
Films directed by Julie Taymor
Films set in Liverpool
Films set in New Jersey
Films set in New York City
Films set in the 1960s
Films shot in New Jersey
Films shot in New York City
Films set in Columbia University
American historical romance films
Hippie films
Jukebox musical films
Vietnam War films
Films scored by Elliot Goldenthal
British historical romance films
Films with screenplays by Dick Clement
Films with screenplays by Ian La Frenais
American historical musical films
Films produced by Suzanne Todd
2000s English-language films
2000s American films
2000s British films